Sou de Qualquer Lugar is the sixth studio album by Brazilian singer Daniela Mercury, released on November 20, 2001 on RCA Records. After the success of the previous record, Sol da Liberdade (2000), which one she experimented electronic genres, she decided to following the experience with new sounds, like pop and dance, but also new genres that were winning space at the time, like the forró.

Sou de Qualquer Lugar received mixed critics, the album was not well received by some critics who didn't accept the singer change of sound, and the many different genres on the work. The album was certified gold by the ABPD, selling over 200.000 copies, and becoming the less selling album at the time.

Track listing

References 

2001 albums
Daniela Mercury albums
RCA Records albums